Major-General William Brattle (April 18, 1706 – October 25, 1776) was an American politician, lawyer, cleric, physician and military officer who served as the Attorney General of Massachusetts from 1736 to 1738. Brattle is best known for his role during the American Revolution, in which he initially aligned himself with the Patriot cause before transferring his allegiances towards the Loyalist camp, which led to the eventual downfall of his fortunes.

The son of a prominent Massachusetts cleric, Brattle graduated from Harvard College in 1722 and eventually inherited the estates of both his father and uncle, making him one of the richest men in the colony. Brattle dabbled in medicine and law before spending the majority of his career as both a politician and a military officer in the colonial militia, serving through two French and Indian Wars and rising to the rank of brigadier-general by 1760.

When tensions increased between Great Britain and its American colonies, Brattle initially supported the Patriot side before joining the Loyalist cause after a disagreement over judges' salaries. In 1774, Brattle wrote a letter to Governor Thomas Gage about the state of a gunpowder magazine outside Boston; rising tensions led Gage to order the gunpowder there to be relocated, infuriating local residents who forced Brattle to seek British protection.

Brattle remained in British-controlled Boston during the outbreak of the American Revolutionary War, including when it was placed under siege by the Continental Army in 1776. He left alongside the British military when they evacuated the city in March 1776, settling in the city of Halifax, Nova Scotia, where Brattle died seven months later at the age of 70. Brattle Street in Cambridge and the town of Brattleboro, Vermont, are both named in his honor.

Early life

William Brattle was born on April 18, 1706, in Cambridge, Massachusetts. His father, The Rev. William Brattle, was a Congregationalist cleric who served as the minister of the First Parish in Cambridge from 1696 to 1717; he was also a Harvard College graduate, a fellow of the Royal Society, and a slaveholder. Brattle's mother was Elizabeth Hayman Brattle, who died on July 28, 1715. He had an older brother, Thomas, who died young.

His father died in 1717, and the young Brattle began attending Harvard College the next year. During his time there, he entered the college at the head of his class, which included Richard Saltonstall (from the prominent Saltonstall family) and future Rhode Island politician and merchant William Ellery Sr.; Brattle was also fined for violating Harvard's rules. After four years, Brattle graduated from Harvard in 1722 with a Bachelor of Arts degree.

In 1727, at the age of 21, Brattle, as the sole heir of both of his father and Brattle's uncle Thomas, inherited their estates, which made him one of the wealthiest men in all of Massachusetts. By this point in his life, Brattle had "inherited a large and well invested property, and had ample means to cultivate those tastes to which, by his nature and education, he was inclined." In the same year, he ordered the construction of a large mansion.

Career in Massachusetts

After he had graduated from Harvard, Brattle briefly became a cleric and started to give sermons. However, by 1725 he had decided he was no longer interested in continuing to pursue the ministry and began to practice medicine, providing treatments during his time in Cambridge to both residents and college students. He also operated a private legal practice and, "particularly dedicated to his alma mater", sat on the Harvard Board of Overseers.

In 1729, Brattle was chosen to serve as a selectman on the board of selectmen of Cambridge; he would go on to serve as a selectman 21 times over the course of his career. He was elected as a representative to the House of Assembly of Massachusetts Bay in 1736. In the same year, Brattle also began serving as the Attorney General of Massachusetts, continuing to serve in the position until fellow lawyer John Overing succeeded him two years later.

Brattle began his military service in the provincial militia in 1729 by becoming a member of the Ancient and Honorable Artillery Company of Massachusetts (AHAC). Four years later, while he was serving as an infantry officer in the 1st Regiment of Militia of Middlesex, Brattle wrote and then published a military training manual titled Sundry Rules and Directions for Drawing up a Regiment, which "many an English or American officer packed in his haversack".

His family connections placed him among the Massachusetts elite, and Brattle quickly became involved in many of the major political, religious and military developments of the period. During the 1740s, he was an opponent of the First Great Awakening, a Christian revival that swept Great Britain and its North American colonies. Brattle quarrelled with Anglican cleric George Whitefield, a major proponent of the revival who accused Harvard College of irreligiosity.

In 1745, amidst a French invasion scare in British North America as a result of King George's War, the governor of Massachusetts William Shirley (of whom Brattle was a dedicated supporter) appointed him as the commander of all provincial soldiers stationed at Castle William; there, Brattle primarily served as a drillmaster. Brattle continued to serve in the militia during the French and Indian War, and in 1760 he was promoted to the rank of brigadier-general.

American Revolution and death

In the 1760s, Brattle, by now serving on the Massachusetts Governor's Council, emerged as one of the leaders of colonial opposition to British imperial policies which were being promulgated by Governor Francis Bernard and Lieutenant-Governor Thomas Hutchinson. Although sympathetic towards the Sons of Liberty, by 1773 Brattle split with the Patriots over the issue of the salaries of judges; he thought that their salaries should be fixed in order to secure the judges' independence from both the governor and the assembly, and published several letters arguing his case.

According to historian William Pencak, from that point onwards, "Brattle could be counted among the increasing numbers of the old political élite who, while initially having opposed British policy, feared that the growth of popular politics threatened the social order." For shifting his allegiance towards the Loyalist camp, Hutchinson rewarded Brattle with a promotion to the rank of major-general. As head of the militia, Brattle "appeared prominently at the increasingly futile displays of royal authority", and signed a testimonial defending Hutchinson alongside "others of his class".

Brattle wrote a letter to Governor Thomas Gage on August 27, 1774, informing him that a quantity of black powder belonging to the British colonial government was all that remained in the Old Powder House, a gunpowder magazine on the outskirts of Boston, as the gunpowder owned by the various Massachusetts towns nearby had already been removed. This persuaded Gage to remove the remaining powder for safekeeping by the British, sparking what would become known as the Powder Alarm as news of the attempt spread amongst angered crowds in the region.

On August 31, Gage dispatched Middlesex County sheriff David Phips to Brattle with orders to remove the powder; Brattle handed the magazine key over to him. Gage also concurrently lost the letter Brattle wrote to him, which was soon found and publicized by Patriots. Rumors emerged that violence had broken out during the powder's removal; an angry mob surrounded Brattle's mansion, forcing him and his family to flee towards Boston seeking British protection. However, the tension eventually subsided as it became apparent that no such violence had occurred.

Two days later on September 2, several newspapers in Boston published a letter from Brattle in which he insisted that he had not warned Gage to remove the powder; according to Brattle, Gage had requested a full account of the storehouse's contents from him, and he had complied. Brattle remained in Boston, living on British-held Castle Island after the outbreak of the Revolutionary War, including the siege of Boston, leaving alongside the British military when they evacuated the city in March 1776. He died in Halifax, Nova Scotia, on October 25, 1776, at the age of 70.

Personal life, family and legacy

During his lifetime, Brattle gained a reputation as a "jovial, pleasure-loving man" whose political enemies dubbed him "Brigadier Paunch". American statesman John Adams described Brattle as having "acquired great popularity by his zeal, and, I must say, by his indecorous and indiscreet ostentation of it, against the measures of the British government." Brattle was also a slaveholder, being recorded in church records as owning two enslaved women, Philicia and Zillah, in 1731 and 1738 respectively. After his death in Halifax, he was buried in the Old Burying Ground.

In 1727, Brattle married Katherine Saltonstall, daughter of governor of Connecticut Gurdon Saltonstall. After she died in 1752, Brattle married Martha Fitch, the widow of politician James Allen, in 1755. Brattle had nine children, though only two survived to adulthood, Thomas and Katherine. After the American Revolutionary War, Thomas Brattle managed to convince the government of the United States that he supported had supported the Patriots in the war, despite previously posing as a Loyalist while staying in England, and as such was allowed to keep the family mansion.

A prominent property-owner in Massachusetts, Brattle owned several properties in Cambridge, Boston, Oakham, Halifax and southeastern Vermont.  In Cambridge, Massachusetts, Brattle Street and Brattle Square are both named after him, as is the town of Brattleboro, Vermont (which was originally called Brattleborough). The town in Vermont was named after Brattle as he was one of Brattleborough's principal proprietors, even though, as noted by historians Austin Jacobs Coolidge and John Brainard Mansfield, there is no record of him ever visiting the settlement.

In the 21st century, the Brattle family's slave ownership has come under increasing scrutiny and controversy. On April 26, 2022, Harvard University released a report detailing the university's ties to slavery and plans to redress such connections; the report noted that both Brattle and his father, in addition to being prominent Harvard affiliates, were slaveowners. Several writers have also made calls to contextualize locations named after Brattle and his father (along with other places with link to slavery) by noting their slavery connections in order to increase public awareness.

References

Footnotes

Books

Newspapers

 
 
 
 
 
 

1706 births
1776 deaths
18th-century American physicians
18th-century American politicians
18th-century British North American people
18th-century Christian clergy
American lawyers
American Loyalists from Massachusetts
American slave owners
Colonial American generals
Harvard College alumni
Harvard College Loyalists in the American Revolution
Loyalists who settled Nova Scotia
Massachusetts Attorneys General
Massachusetts colonial-era clergy
Members of the colonial Massachusetts House of Representatives
Military personnel from colonial Massachusetts
People of Massachusetts in the French and Indian War
Politicians from Cambridge, Massachusetts
Politicians from the Thirteen Colonies
Slave owners from the Thirteen Colonies